Robert IV of Dreux (1241–1282), Count of Dreux, Braine and Montfort-l'Amaury, was the son of John I of Dreux and Marie of Bourbon.

Robert fought with Philip III of France in 1272 in his expedition to the Languedoc and was present at the capture of Foix.

In 1260 he married Beatrice de Montfort, Countess of Montfort-l'Amaury daughter of Jean I de Montfort and Jeanne, Dame de Chateaudun, and granddaughter of Amaury de Montfort. Their son John succeeded his father while their eldest daughter Yolande (1263–1322) married Alexander III, King of Scots, and later Arthur II, Duke of Brittany.

List of children
 Marie de Dreux (1261–1276), married in 1273 Mathieu IV de Montmorency
 Yolande of Dreux, Countess de Montfort (1263–1323), married firstly on 15 October 1285 King Alexander III of Scotland, and secondly in 1292 Arthur II, Duke of Brittany.
 John II of Dreux (1265–1309), married firstly Jeanne de Beaujeu, Dame de Montpensier (died 1308), in 1308 he married secondly Perrenelle de Sully
 Jeanne, Countess de Braine, married firstly Count Jean IV de Roucy, and secondly John of Bar
 Beatrice de Dreux (1270–1328), Abbess of Pont-Royal
 Robert de Dreux, seigneur de Cateau-du-Loire

References

Sources

Dreux, Robert IV, Count of
Dreux, Robert IV, Count of
Counts of Dreux
House of Dreux
Burials at the Abbey of Saint-Yved de Braine